SIMPLE Group Limited is a conglomeration of separately run companies that each has its core area in International Consulting. The core business areas are Legal Services, Fiduciary Activities, Banking Intermediation and Corporate Service.

The date of incorporation is listed as 1999 by Companies House of Gibraltar, who class it as a holding company; however it is understood that SIMPLE Group's business and trading activities date to the  second part of the 90s, probably as an incorporated body.

SIMPLE Group Limited is a conglomerate that cultivate secrecy, they are not listed on any Stock Exchange and the group is owned by a complicated series of offshore trusts. The Sunday Times stated that SIMPLE Group's interests could be evaluated at £77 million; the shareholders are understood to be a group of Swiss Private Banks' owners.

Each of the companies operating under the SIMPLE Group umbrella is independent, with most being majority owned by SIMPLE Group, while previous owners still hold minority stakes. Occasionally, They simply license the SIMPLE brand to a company that has purchased a division or service from them.

With a few exceptions, none of the companies began as wholly owned SIMPLE Group's subsidiaries but instead were acquired from different previous owners.

Footnotes

External links

Official Registrar of Companies in GIBRALTAR

Financial services companies of Gibraltar